Osnaburgh 63A is a First Nations reserve on Lake St. Joseph in Thunder Bay District, Ontario. It is one of the reserves of the Mishkeegogamang First Nation, alongside Osnaburgh 63B.

Osnaburgh 63A is made up of three separate areas known as Ace Lake, Eric Lake, Ten Houses.

External links
Official site

References

Ojibwe reserves in Ontario
Communities in Thunder Bay District